= Supreme Star =

Supreme Star is the nickname of various actors in Indian cinema, including:

- Suresh Gopi (born 1958), Indian actor and politician
- R. Sarathkumar (born 1954), Indian actor, filmmaker and politician
